The 1982 WNBL season was the second season of competition since its establishment in 1981. A total of 10 teams contested the league.

Ladder

Finals

Season Awards

References 

1981
1982 in Australian basketball
Aus
basketball